The Mercury, formerly The Natal Mercury, is an English-language newspaper owned by Independent Media (Pty) Ltd, a subsidiary of Iqbal Survé's Sekunjalo Investments and published in Durban, South Africa.

Content

The paper focuses on the important national and local news of the day, with background and analysis. Its leader and opinion pages offer a platform for a diversity of views and aims to foster informed debate.

The daily Business Report within The Mercury contains news on international market trends, and national company and business news.

Weekly supplements include the GoodLife, Motoring, and Network. Network (on Wednesday) specifically focuses on KZN business, property and shipping news. The Zululand and Pietermaritzburg areas are specifically covered within Network. The Mercury includes dedicated golf pages on Tuesday.

The Mercury also contains local entertainment and arts news. The Friday edition includes a guide to weekend events in KZN.

See also
 List of newspapers in South Africa

Bibliography 
 Terry Wilks:  For the Love of Natal: The Life and Times of the Natal Mercury 1852–1977. The Natal Mercury, Durban/Pinetown 1977.

References

External links
 The Mercury online edition
 SAARF Website

1852 establishments in the Colony of Natal
Mass media in Durban
Daily newspapers published in South Africa
Publications established in 1852
1852 establishments in South Africa